Fritzi Haberlandt (born 6 June 1975, in East Berlin) is a German actress. She studied theatre at the Ernst Busch Academy of Dramatic Arts. Early in her career, she played the role of Lucile Duplessis in Danton's Death, with the Berliner Ensemble, in a production directed by Robert Wilson. She has appeared in such films as Learning to Lie, The Moon and Other Lovers, Cold Is the Breath of Evening, and Summer Window.

Haberlandt is a member of the Thalia Theater in Hamburg.

Selected filmography
  (2000)
 Heimatfilm! (2002)
 Learning to Lie (2003)
 Peas at 5:30 (2004)
  (2007)
  (2007)
 Ein spätes Mädchen (2007, TV movie)
  (2008, TV movie)
 The Moon and Other Lovers (2008)
 Tatort:  (2009, TV series episode)
 Tatort:  (2010, TV series episode)
  (2011)
 Eine Insel namens Udo (2011)
 Nacht ohne Morgen (2011, TV movie)
  (2012)
 Fog in August (2016)
 Tatort:  (2016, TV series episode)
 Babylon Berlin (2017-2020, TV series)
 Deutschland 86 (2018, TV series)
 Deutschland 89 (2020, TV series)

External links
 

1975 births
Living people
German film actresses
German stage actresses
German television actresses
Ernst Busch Academy of Dramatic Arts alumni
People from East Berlin
Actresses from Berlin
21st-century German actresses
20th-century German women